Motional is an American autonomous vehicle company founded in March 2020 as a joint venture between automaker Hyundai Motor Group and auto supplier Aptiv. Headquartered in Boston, Massachusetts, Motional also maintains operations in Pittsburgh, Singapore, Las Vegas, and Los Angeles. Motional began testing its newest generation of vehicles in Las Vegas, Nevada, in February 2021, and also operates vehicles in Pittsburgh and Santa Monica, California.

Name 
'Motional' is a portmanteau of motion and emotional, with motion referring to the movement of self-driving cars and emotional expressing the willingness to realize the value of human respect.

History 

 2013 - nuTonomy and Ottomatika, Inc. are established as spin-offs at Massachusetts Institute of Technology and Carnegie Mellon University.
 2015 - Delphi acquired Ottomatika
 2015 - Delphi demonstrates what they claim to be America's first fully autonomous transcontinental crossing.
 2016 - nuTonomy trial operated the world's first autonomous taxi in Singapore.  
 2017 - nuTonomy begins autonomous driving in Boston
 2017 - Delphi acquired nuTonomy
 2017 - Delphi renamed as Aptiv
 2018 - Aptiv acquired NuTonomy and Ottomatika and formed an Autonomous Driving Team
 2018 - First public robotaxi service tests in Las Vegas in collaboration with Lyft, with 50,000 rides in the first year
 2019 - Aptiv & Hyundai Motor Group officially announce an autonomous driving joint venture
 2020 - The establishment of Motional, an autonomous driving technology development joint venture
 2021 - Autonomous (SAE level 4) vehicle test drive successful on normal roads
 2022 - Motional and Lyft's public service is launched in Las Vegas using autonomous, all-electric Hyundai Ioniq 5 vehicles with a safety driver
 2022 - Motional and Lyft announced the planned launch of a fully driverless ride-hail service in Los Angeles

References

External links 
 

2020 establishments in Massachusetts
Self-driving car companies
Hyundai Motor Group